Jerusalem Festival of Light is a week-long Israeli light festival held every summer in Jerusalem.

History
The Jerusalem Festival of Light was established in 2009. It  displays the work of leading international artists who use light as their creative medium.

In 2011, the festival, located in and around Jerusalem's Old City drew over 200,000 visitors. In 2012 the show was extended into other neighborhoods of the Old City, including the    Rehov Hagay, the commercial street leading from the Damascus Gate.  
 

The festival, which lasts a week, is sponsored by the Jerusalem Municipality, the Prime Minister’s Office, the semi-public Ariel Company and the Jerusalem Development Authority.  The cost of 7 million NIS is partly defrayed by commercial sponsors.

See also
Culture of Israel
Israeli art

References

External links
 Official Website

Cultural festivals in Israel
Festivals in Jerusalem
Summer festivals
Tourist attractions in Jerusalem
Summer events in Israel
Light festivals